State Route 188 is a  state highway located primarily in Gila County in the U.S. state of Arizona.

Route description

The route, also known as Apache Trail at its southern end, starts at U.S. Route 60 in Globe, just north of Claypool, and runs generally northwest to a junction with State Route 288, then continues alongside Roosevelt Lake. The route briefly enters Maricopa County, where it junctions with State Route 88, which takes over the Apache Trail designation to Apache Junction. SR 188 then re-enters Gila County, continuing through Tonto Basin and Punkin Center. The route originally followed a single-lane road down the canyon wall to the Theodore Roosevelt Dam, then crossed the dam to the other side of the canyon. A two-lane steel arch bridge upstream from the dam has now replaced this routing. State Route 188 ends at State Route 87 south of Rye.

Between Claypool and Roosevelt Lake is an old loop road labelled "Old Highway 88"; originally State Route 88 continued down 188 from Roosevelt Lake to US 60 at Claypool. State Route 188 has been widened to a multi-lane highway along part of its length.

History
SR 188 was established in 1957 from SR 88 to SR 87. On August 20, 1999, it extended over part of SR 88, completing its current length.

Junction list

References

External links

State Route 188 at Arizonaroads.com
Arizona state highway map at the Arizona Department of Transportation (magnification may be required for legibility)

188
Transportation in Gila County, Arizona
Transportation in Maricopa County, Arizona